Tania M. Ka'ai, sometimes known as Tania Kaai-Oldman, is a New Zealand Education academic. She is of Ngāti Porou, Ngāi Tahu, Native Hawaiian, Cook Island Māori, and Sāmoan descent and is a full professor of Language Revitalisation at the Auckland University of Technology.

Academic career

Ka'ai earned a 1995 education PhD from the University of Waikato, with thesis titled  ' Te tātari i te kaupapa' , looked at ways the New Zealand qualifications framework could be used as a tool for indigenous knowledge to be integrated and recognised as a valid part of the education system in New Zealand After working at the University of Otago, Ka'ai moved to the Auckland University of Technology with John Moorfield.

Ka'ai's research is centred on learning of indigenous languages (particularly te reo) in formal and semi-formal educational settings. She is a strong advocate for te reo being compulsory in New Zealand schools.

Selected works 
 Ka'ai, Tania. Introduction to Māori culture and society. Longman, 2004.
 Ka'ai, Tania M., and Rawinia Higgins. "Te ao Māori–Māori world-view." Ki Te Whaiao–An Introduction to Māori Culture and Society. Auckland: Pearson Education (2004): 13–25.
 Jenkins, Kuni, and Tania Ka’ai. "Maori education: A cultural experience and dilemma for the state–a new direction for Maori society." The politics of learning and teaching in Aotearoa–New Zealand (1994): 79–148.
 Ka’ai, Tania. "Te hiringa taketake: Mai i te Kohanga Reo i te kura= Maori pedagogy: te Kohanga Reo and the transition to school." MSc Thesis, ResearchSpace@ Auckland, 1990.
 Ka'ai, Tania. "Te mana o te reo me ngā tikanga: Power and politics of the language." (2004).

References

External links
 
 
 AUT homepage
 Te Ipukarea homeapge

Living people
Year of birth missing (living people)
New Zealand women academics
University of Waikato alumni
University of Auckland alumni
Academic staff of the Auckland University of Technology
Māori language revivalists
New Zealand Māori people
New Zealand people of Samoan descent
Native Hawaiian people
Cook Island Māori people
New Zealand Māori women academics
New Zealand women writers